The Supremes In The Orient is a 1966 short documentary film about the Motown number one female group, The Supremes.

Plot 
In September 1966, The Supremes toured in Asia to promote their most recent album The Supremes A' Go-Go. The documentary includes footages of Florence Ballard, Diana Ross and Mary Wilson performing on stage, backstage and press conferences along other appearances in Japan. Motown chairman Berry Gordy Jr. and his sister, fellow CEO Esther Gordy Edwards appeared on the footages.

See also
List of American films of 1966

References
 http://classic.motown.com/

1966 films
Documentary films about pop music and musicians
Motown Productions films
Unreleased American films
1960s English-language films